Thomas Joseph Tobin (born April 1, 1948) is an American prelate of the Roman Catholic Church. He has been serving as the bishop of the Diocese of Providence in Rhode Island since 2005.  Tobin previously served as bishop of the Diocese of Youngstown in Ohio from 1995 to 2005 and as auxiliary bishop of the Diocese of Pittsburgh in Pennsylvania from 1992 to 1995.

Tobin has been an outspoken critic of abortion and same-sex marriage.

Biography

Early life
Thomas Tobin was born on April 1, 1948 in Pittsburgh, Pennsylvania. He studied at St. Mark Seminary High School and Gannon University, both in Erie, Pennsylvania.  He then entered St. Francis University in Loretto, Pennsylvania, where he received his bachelor's degree in 1969.  Tobin went to study at Pontifical North American College and Pontifical Gregorian University, both in Rome. He also pursued his graduate studies at the Pontifical Atheneum of St. Anselm in Rome.

Priesthood 
Tobin was ordained to the priesthood by Bishop Vincent Leonard for the Diocese of Pittsburgh on July 21, 1973.  After his ordination, Tobin served as an assistant pastor at St. Vitus Parish in New Castle, Pennsylvania for six years.  In 1979, he was appointed assistant pastor at St. Sebastian Parish in Ross Township. Pennsylvania, serving there until 1984.  Tobin was named administrative secretary to Bishop Anthony Bevilacqua, then associate general secretary of the diocese in 1987, and vicar general and general secretary in 1990.

Bishop

Auxiliary Bishop of Pittsburgh

On November 3, 1992, Tobin was appointed as auxiliary bishop of the Diocese of Pittsburgh and titular bishop of Novica by Pope John Paul II. He received his episcopal consecration on December 27, 1992, from then bishop Donald Wuerl, with Bishop Anthony Bosco and Bishop Nicholas C. Dattilo serving as co-consecrators.

Bishop of Youngstown

John Paul II appointed Tobin as bishop of the Diocese of Youngstown on December 5, 1995.  He was installed on February 2, 1996. In 1997, Tobin received an honorary doctorate from St. Francis University.

Bishop of Providence
John Paul II appointed Tobin as bishop of the Diocese of Providence on March 31, 2005. He was installed on May 31, 2005. Tobin sits on the Board of Trustees of Providence College and of Salve Regina University. He also maintains a column for his diocesan newspaper, Without a Doubt. These columns have been published in two volumes: Without a Doubt: Bringing Faith to Life and Effective Faith: Faith that Makes a Difference. Tobin is an avid Pittsburgh Steelers fan, and displays a Steelers banner on his residence during each game day.

When the 2018 Pennsylvania Grand Jury Report on Sexual Abuse detailed sexual abuse in the Diocese of Pittsburgh during Tobin's tenure as auxiliary bishop, Tobin said he "became aware of incidents of sexual abuse when they were reported" but not report them to local authorities or to parishioners.  Tobin explained that he was "...not primarily responsible for clergy issues … Issues involving clergy were handled directly by the Diocesan Bishop with the assistance of the clergy office”. He also said that he carried out "other administrative duties such as budgets, property, diocesan staff, working with consultative groups".

Views

Abortion 
In November 2009, US Congressman Patrick J. Kennedy said Tobin told him not to take communion in the diocese because of his support for abortion rights for women. Tobin said he had written Kennedy in confidence in 2007 and never intended a public discussion, adding: "At the same time, I will absolutely respond publicly and strongly whenever he attacks the Catholic Church, misrepresents the teachings of the Church, or issues inaccurate statements about my pastoral ministry."In August 2013, Tobin announced that he had changed his party affiliation from Democratic to Republican, citing the Democratic Party's support for abortion rights as his primary motivation. Later in 2013, he criticized Pope Francis on multiple occasions. After the Pope reprimanded Catholics who "obsess" over abortion, Tobin, without mentioning the Pope by name, called the abortion issue "a very important obsession". "It’s one thing for him to reach out and embrace and kiss little children," Tobin said. "It would also be wonderful if in a spiritual way he would reach out and embrace and kiss unborn children." He added that he was "a little disappointed in Pope Francis." Many Rhode Island lawmakers criticized Tobin for his words, both on abortion and homosexuality, with one alleging that his tone was "not very Christian-like." Many publicly stated that they preferred Francis's less dogmatic approach. Tobin later defended himself, referring to his comments as "little concerns," adding that he had said "a lot of nice things" about the Pope. On a separate occasion, he asked, "Is an ‘easy’ church, devoid of any moral imperatives or challenge, being faithful to its mission?"

LGBT rights 
When President Barack Obama announced support for same-sex marriage, Tobin said it was "a sad day in American history". He teaches that voting for an abortion rights supporter, feminist, or pro-LGBTQ candidate is morally unacceptable.  He also stated:

On June 1, 2019, Tobin tweeted:

Tobin received both backlash and support for the tweet, and as reported by the Catholic News Agency and others, of the over 88,000 responses and comments, most were critical. After Motif Magazine published a critical open letter to Tobin in response to the tweet, the diocese withdrew permission for the State Theater Awards, hosted and sponsored by Motif, to be held at the church-owned McVinney Auditorium in Providence. The Boston Globe and The Providence Journal quoted a diocese spokesperson: "Motif Magazine published and embraced an open letter which does not comply with our venue’s policies. McVinney Auditorium did not have a signed contract in place for this event and felt it in the best interest of both parties to not host the magazine’s award ceremony this year."On August 12, 2020, Tobin suggested on Twitter that Democratic presidential candidate Joe Biden, a confirmed Catholic who regularly attends Mass, was not a true Catholic.
 On October 21, 2020, Tobin expressed opposition to Pope Francis' call for civil unions. He said that it:...clearly contradicts what has been the long-standing teaching of the Church. Individuals with same-sex attraction are beloved children of God and must have their personal human rights and civil rights recognized and protected by law. However, the legalization of their civil unions, which seek to simulate holy matrimony, is not admissible.

See also

 Catholic Church hierarchy
 Catholic Church in the United States
 Historical list of the Catholic bishops of the United States
 List of Catholic bishops of the United States
 Lists of patriarchs, archbishops, and bishops

References

External links
Roman Catholic Diocese of Providence Official Site
Book:  Effective Faith:  Faith that Makes a Difference
Without a Doubt Column Archive

1948 births
Living people
Roman Catholic bishops of Providence
Roman Catholic bishops of Youngstown
20th-century Roman Catholic bishops in the United States
21st-century Roman Catholic bishops in the United States
Roman Catholic Diocese of Pittsburgh
Gannon University alumni
Saint Francis University alumni
Religious leaders from Pennsylvania
Rhode Island Republicans